"Western Girls" is a song by New Zealand-Australian rock band Dragon released in November 1986 as the third single from the group's eighth studio album Dreams of Ordinary Men (1986). The song peaked at number 58 on the Australian Kent Music Report and 37 in New Zealand.

Track listing 
 "Western Girls" (Alan Mansfield, Doane Perry, Marc Hunter, Sharon O'Neill, Todd Rundgren) - 4:10
 "When I'm Gone" (Marc Hunter, Martin Briley) - 3:30

Charts

References 

Dragon (band) songs
1986 singles
1986 songs
Polydor Records singles
Songs written by Todd Rundgren
Songs written by Marc Hunter
Songs written by Sharon O'Neill